Nordic Music Days is a festival for new Nordic music that was founded in 1888 and had its origins in existing musical collaboration. It is one of the oldest festivals for contemporary classical music in the world. The festival is unique in the respect that it is arranged by the composers themselves.

Each year one of members, the national societies of composers, arranges the festival on behalf of the Council of Nordic Composers.

History

From the mid-nineteenth century, at regular intervals, song festivals were arranged where choirs from all over the North met. The repertoire was decidedly ‘national’ – one could say that when the Nordic countries were gathered there was a need to express national distinctiveness. Joint activities were arranged too; for example in 1929 when a choir of 1000 sang the Nordic cantata Song of the North, composed jointly by five composers – one from each Nordic country. The song festivals continued well into the first half of the twentieth century.

The first true “Nordic Music Days” was held in Copenhagen in 1888 and its main emphasis was on instrumental and orchestral music. This was to be a forum where Nordic composers could have their works performed, and the first festival presented works from Denmark, Norway and Sweden – among other ways in seven large-scale choral and orchestral concerts.

The next festivals were held in Stockholm in 1897, and in 1919 – again in Copenhagen, where among others Carl Nielsen, Jean Sibelius, Wilhelm Stenhammer and Johan Halvorsen conducted. The first time the festival was held in Helsinki was 1921, then it was held in Stockholm in 1927, in Helsinki again in 1932, and finally in Oslo in 1934. The Copenhagen 1938 festival was the last one before the outbreak of World War II.

After the war the Nordic composers’ societies joined forces to form the Nordic Council of Composers, which immediately after its establishment in 1946 assumed the main responsibility for Nordic Music Days. Since 1948 the festival has been held in turn in the Nordic capitals every other year. Until the 1970s the repertoire profile was still purely Nordic, but from 1974- 82 composers and works from a ‘guest country’ were invited: Poland in 1974, Canada in 1976, the GDR in 1978, the UK in 1980, and in 1982 France. After this it went back to being a festival exclusively for new Nordic music.

Past Festivals

Reykjavik 2016

Copenhagen 2015

Oslo 2014

In 2014, the Ultima Oslo Contemporary Music Festival hosted Nordic Music Days on behalf of the Norwegian Society of Composers. The theme of the festival, which was arranged parallel to the Ultima festival in September 2014, was "Nation". The artistic director of the festival was Lars Petter Hagen.

Helsinki 2013

Artistic leaders for the 2013 festival were Nils Schweckendiek, Petri Kumela and Sami Klemola.

Music for Brightly Lit Places is the series for orchestra concerts. This series is curated by Nils Schweckendiek.

Chamber Music Series is made of six chamber music concerts, all with its own title. This series is curated by Petri Kumela.

Club Evenings puts contemporary classical and today's avantgarde club music into same context. This series is curated by Sami Klemola.

Fairy Tales in Music is a composition contest to get new repertoire for productions for schools.

Young Instrumentalists concert lets music institute instrument students show their hands at contemporary concert music.

In addition, three fringe seminars run simultaneously to the NMD 2013: New Music: New Audiences, The Kolmio-hanke final seminar and The Nordic Orchestra Librarians' Union's annual meetings.

Locations

Concerts are centered around the Helsinki Music Center

Helsinki Music Center – Concert Hall, Camerata and Foyer are used for the NMD concerts.

Sibelius Academy Concert Hall - the Sibelius Academy's R House concert hall.

The Church in the Rock/Temple Church – The famous 1960's church carved in bedrock.

Kulttuuritehdas Korjaamo – old tram halls converted into a culture space.

Copenhagen 2010

As a part of the festival, in cooperation with the RE:NEW MUSIC project, Nordic Music Days 2010 hosted an international conference on audience engagement with guests from all over Europe.

The School Concert invited children in 3rd–5th grade to a concert with the Danish National Vocal Ensemble/DR and the Danish National Chamber Orchestra. Ahead of the concert, some educational material had been composed with tasks and listening examples. Through various practical exercises, the pupils work their way into the music and thoroughly learn about the musical works they will experience in the concert. The material was free of charge and could be ordered from www.nordicmusicdays2010.org.

Close Encounter invited a group of high school students to design a concert for Nordic Music Days 2010 together with the Danish commune of composers, Dygong. The students were engaged in all phases of the production from idea through programme and marketing to performance. This way the students got an idea of how to create a concert with contemporary music and the possibility of presenting an exciting concert on their own.

New Nordic Composers’ Workshop was a workshop for music school students in the Nordic countries. For three days, three students from each of the Nordic countries will create their own music together with a composer from each country. The workshop ends with a work-in-progress concert where the students perform the music that they have created.

Program Committee for Happy Nordic Music Days 2009

The programme committee for Happy Nordic Music Days 2009 in Oslo are Lars Petter Hagen, chairman/artistic director, Trond Reinholdtsen, co-artistic director, and Catharina Backman (Sweden), Peter Bruun (Denmark), Magne Hegdal (Norway), Beglind María Tómasdóttir (Iceland), Juan Antonio Muro (Finland).

The programme committee currently working with Nordic Music Days 2010 in Copenhagen are Peter Bruun, artistic director, and Jeppe Just Christensen (Denmark), Daniel Nelson (Sweden), Magne Hegdal (Norway), Haraldur V. Sveinbjörnsson (Iceland), and Tapio Tuomela (Finland).

Helsinki 2008

It is not music – but music plus one. In these concerts music is combined with other elements of art. Nordic composers want to find out what comes when you combine contemporary music with new circus, old theatre, wild movements and slow text.
Music +1: Action; Theatre; Concert; Puppet; Quartet; Circus; Movement; Space; Happening; Sound; Opera.

Artists

All 4 Voices; Avanti! - trio; Circo Aereo; Pascal Contet; Laurent Cuniot; EMO; Galante; Anna-Maria Helsing; The Helsinki Philharmonic Orchestra; Helsinki Concordia; Pasi Hyokki; Markus Kaarto; Sami Koskela;Tiina-Maija Koskela; Heini Karkkainen; Jussi Lehtipuu; Anna Lindal; Jan Erik Mikalsen; Ning; Jukka Nykanen;Rolf Erik Nystrom; Lea Pekkala; Pasi Pirinen; Maria Puusaari; Thomas Sandberg; Jani Siven; Jutta Sepinnen; Dmitri Slobodeniouk; Christoffer Sundqvist; The Finnish Boys Choir; Talla; Tapiola Sinfonietta; Jani Telaranta; VOX;Tm+; Zagros.

Composers

Thomas Agerfeldt Olesen DK, Anneli Arho FI, Fredric Bergström SE, Christian Winther Christensen DK, Erik Dæhlin NO, Marc-André Dalbavie FR, Anders Emilsson SE, Sebastian Fagerlund FI, Davíð Brynjar Franzson IS, Ríkharður H. Friðriksson IS, Claus Gahrn DK, Jakob Weigand Goetz DK, Perttu Haapanen FI, Magne Hegdal NO, Mikko Heiniö FI, Asko Hyvärinen FI, Jyrki Linjama FI, Ida Lundén SE, Bruno Mantovani FR, Jan Erik Mikalsen NO, Tristan Murail FR, Knut Nystedt NO, Kent Olofsson SE, Andy Pape DK, Maja Ratkje NO, Steingrimur Rohloff IS, Niels Rosing-Schow DK, Marie Samuelsson SE, Patric Simmerud SE, Amund Sjølie Sveen NO, Mattias Svensson SE, Rune Søchting DK, Anna Þorvaldsdóttir IS, Leilei Tian FR, Tapio Tuomela FI, Harri Vuori FI, Edvin Østergaard NO, Fredrik Österling SE

Iceland 2006

The music festival Nordic Music Days marked its 118th anniversary in 2006 years. The festival has been a focus of musical life in the Nordic countries, and also an important forum for new Nordic music. Over the years, however, the Faroes – and in more recent years the Baltic countries – have also played an active role in the festival. Nordic Music Days was held in Reykjavík, Iceland, 5–14 October 2006. This was the largest festival of contemporary music ever held in Iceland's history.

Artists from different countries

Canada: Ana Sokolovic, Quatuor Bozzini, Jean-François Laporte, Laurie Radford, Martin Ouellet, Sean Ferguson.
Artists from Denmark: Bent Sørensen, Carl Dreyer, Christian Præstholm, Hans Abrahamsen, Ivar Frounberg, Jakob W Goetz, Jens Hørsving, Kaj Aune, Karsten Fundal, Martin Stig-Andersen, Niels Rosing-Schow, Pelle Gudmundsen-Holmgreen, Peter Bruun, Simon Christensen, Simon Steen-Andersen.

Faroe Islands: Atli K. Petersen.

Finland: Antti Auvinen, Asko Hyvärinen, Jan Söderblom, Johan Tallgren, Jukka Koskinen, Jukka Ruohomäki, Jukka Tiensuu, Kimmo Kuokkala, Mikko Luoma, Pekka Jalkanen, Riikka Talvitie, Sampo Haapamäki, Seppo Pohjola, Tommi Kärkkäinen, Veli-Matti Puumala.

France: Franck Ollu.

Germany: Helen Bledsoe, Hermann Bäumer, Great Britain, David Curtis, Loré Lixenberg.

Iceland: Anna Guðný Guðmundsdóttir, Atli Heimir Sveinsson, Atli Ingólfsson, ATON, Áki Ásgeirsson, Áskell Másson, Bjarni Thor Kristinsson, Camilla Söderberg, Caput, Einar Johannesson, Frank Arninck, Guðni Franzson, Guðrún Jóhanna Ólafsdóttir, Gunnar A. Kristinsson, Gunnar Guðbjörnsson, Halla Ólafsdóttir, Haukur Tómasson, Herbert H. Ágústsson, Hildur Ingveldardóttir Guðnadóttir, Hilmar Odeson, Hugi Guðmundsson, Hörður Áskelsson, Iceland Symphony Orchestra, Ingi Garðar Erlendsson, Irma Gunnarsdóttir, Jóhann F. Björgvinsson, Jón Leifs, Jón Nordal, Karlakórinn Fóstbræður, Katrín Hall, Kjartan Ólafsson, Kjartan Óskarsson, Marta Halldórsdóttir, Mist Þorkelsdóttir, Mótettukórinn, Ólöf Ingólfsdóttir, Reykjavik Chamber Orchestra, Reykjavik Orchestral Winds, Schola Cantorum, Sigrún Eðvaldsdóttir, Snorri Sigfús Birgisson, Stefán Jón Bernharðsson, Steingrimur Rohloff, The Hamrahlid Choir, The Iceland Dance Company, The Icelandic Flute Choir, The DANCE Theater, Úlfar Ingi Haraldsson,  Víkingur Ólafssson, Þorkell Sigurbjörsson, Þorgerður Ingólfsdóttir, Þórður Magnússon, Þuríður Jónsdóttir.

Ivory Coast: Kouame G. Sereba.

Mauritanija: Becaye Aw.

Norway: Cikada String Quartet, David Bratlie, Eivind Buene, Frode Haltli, Jon Øyvind Ness, Knut Vaage, Lars-Petter Hagen, Lene Grenager, Knut Vaage, Maja Ratkje, Per Magnus Lindborg, POING, Rolf-Erik Nystrøm, Rolf Wallin, Victoria Johnson.

Sweden: Åke Parmerud, André Chini, Erik Bünger, Fredrik Hedelin, Hanna Hartmann, Ingvar Karkoff, Johannes Bergmark, Karin Rehnqvist, Kent Olofsson, Kim Hedås, Madeleine Isaksson, Malin Bång, Marie Samuelsson, Mårten Josjö, Mats Larsson Gothe, Miklos Maros, Per Mårtensson, Stefan Östersjö, Sten Melin, Sten Sandell, Stockholm Saxofonkvartett.

Ballet

The programme included two ballets commissioned from Icelandic ballet companies – the Iceland Dance Company and the Dance Theatre, which specialises in modern dance.

Radio broadcasts from Iceland

In collaboration with RÚV (Icelandic National Broadcasting) the festival was recorded and broadcast both in Iceland and in all the Nordic countries. Broadcasts from NMD was also in preparation in Europe as a whole – both live and recorded broadcasts.

Copenhagen, Malmö and Helsingborg 2004

Festival of Nordic contemporary music took place in Copenhagen, Malmö and Helsingborg on November 18–28. The festival was organized for the Nordic Council of Composers by the Danish Composers’ Society.

Berlin 2002

MAGMA 2002 BERLIN, is version of the biannual music festival "Nordic Music Days". Nordic Music Days provided a meeting place for composers and performing artists from the Nordic countries. The purpose of the festival has been to disseminate information about Nordic music and promote contact between Nordic composers and musicians. The character of the programme has been revised and expanded in keeping with the changing situation. In 2002, for the first time in its 122-year history, Nordic Music Days came to the heart of Europe's musical culture.

References

External links 

 

Music festivals staged internationally
Music festivals in Norway
Music festivals in Sweden
Music festivals in Finland
Music festivals in Denmark
Music festivals in Iceland
Classical music festivals in Norway
Classical music festivals in Sweden
Classical music festivals in Finland
Classical music festivals in Denmark
Classical music festivals in Germany
Classical music festivals in Iceland
Music festivals established in 1888
Contemporary classical music festivals
1888 establishments in Denmark